Efua Baker (born c. 1967 in Ghana) is a British celebrity fitness expert and trainer who also had a music career in the 1990s.

Career
In 1993, Baker, then known as just Efua, released three singles: "Down Is the Drop", "Strawberry Boy", and "Somewhere".  "Somewhere" was her biggest hit, reaching the top 50 in the UK, and the top 20 in Australia.  "Strawberry Boy" charted on the US Billboard Bubbling Under R&B/Hip-Hop Singles chart.  An album, Dream Juice, was released in June 1993 in the US, and in November 1993 in Australia.

Prior to releasing her own music, Efua worked as a model and a dancer, and appeared in a number of music videos for other artists, including Clive Griffin's "The Way We Touch" and "Don't Make Me Wait", Lil Louis's "I Called U", Soul II Soul's "A Dreams a Dream" (sic), and one of the two videos filmed for Maxi Priest's "Close to You".  In 1996, she appeared in Yazz's music video for "Good Thing Going".  In 2019, Baker appeared in the music video for FKA Twigs' "Cellophane".

Baker's best known work as a fitness expert was on the BBC One programme Fat Nation - the Big Challenge in late 2004.

Personal life
She is married to Soul II Soul frontman Jazzie B.

Discography

Albums

Singles

References

External links
EfuaBaker.com
Efua - Somewhere, (YouTube.com)

Living people
Ghanaian emigrants to the United Kingdom
Ghanaian women singers
British women singers
1960s births